The 1984 Plaid Cymru presidential election was held following the resignation of Dafydd Wigley, who had led the party since 1981, on the grounds of his caring commitments linked to his children's health conditions.

The contest was between Meirionnydd Nant Conwy MP Dafydd Elis Thomas and Gwynedd-based politician Dafydd Iwan.

The contest was won by Dafydd Elis Thomas  with the result being announced at Plaid Cymru's conference in Lampeter on Saturday 27 October 1984, Thomas went on to serve until he stood down in October 1991.

Notes

References

Plaid Cymru leadership elections
1984 elections in the United Kingdom
1984 in Wales
1980s elections in Wales
Plaid Cymru presidential election